Margaret Francis Ellen Baskerville (1861–1930), was an Australian sculptor, water-colourist, and educator. She is regarded as Victoria's first professional woman sculptor.

Biography
Baskerville was born on 14 September 1861 in Melbourne, Victoria, Australia.  From 1879-1887 she attended National Gallery School in  Melbourne, in both the School of Painting and the School of Design. In 1886 she joined and was an active member of the bohemian Buonarotti Club in its last two years. From 1904-1906 she attended the Royal College of Art Modelling School in London, England.

Baskerville returned to Australia in 1906. She assisted her former teacher Charles Douglas Richardson in a shared studio. The two married in 1914.

Baskerville created a number of monuments in Australian. Her first commission was the major commission for a bronze monument to the 22nd Premier of Victoria, Sir Thomas Bent. She was the first Australian woman sculptor to receive this honour. She also produced the James Cuming memorial, and the Edith Cavell memorial.

She exhibited her work regularly, and her last exhibition was in 1929.

Baskerville was a member of the Melbourne Society of Women Painters and Sculptors. Other memberships include the Yarra Sculptors' Society, the Victorian Sketching Club, the Women's Art Club, the council of the Australian Institute of the Arts and Literature, the Austral Salon and the Victorian Artists Society.

Baskerville died on 6 July 1930 in Melbourne.

Baskerville Street in the Canberra suburb of Chisholm is named in her honour.

References

1861 births
1930 deaths
20th-century Australian sculptors
Australian women sculptors
Artists from Melbourne
20th-century Australian women artists
19th-century Australian women artists
19th-century Australian sculptors
National Gallery of Victoria Art School alumni
Alumni of the Royal College of Art